Hollow Tree is a Western red cedar tree stump and a popular landmark in Stanley Park in Vancouver, British Columbia.

History
The tree was damaged during a December 2006 windstorm and was slated for removal. In 2009, the Stanley Park Hollow Tree Conservation Society was formed and began raising money from private donors to preserve the landmark. A ceremony for the restored tree was held in October 2011.

Two "suspicious" fires were put out by firefighters in September 2014.

See also
 List of individual trees

References

External links
 

Individual trees in Canada
Stanley Park
Tourist attractions in Vancouver